The 2014–15 SMU Mustangs men's basketball team represented Southern Methodist University (SMU) during the 2014–15 NCAA Division I men's basketball season. The Mustangs, led by third year head coach Larry Brown, played their home games on their campus in University Park, Texas at Moody Coliseum. They were members of the American Athletic Conference. They finished the season 27–7, 15–3 in AAC play to win the America Athletic regular season championship. They defeated East Carolina, Temple, and UConn to become champions of the America Athletic tournament. They received an automatic bid to the NCAA tournament where they lost on a controversial goaltending call in the second round to UCLA.

Off-season

Departures

2014 recruiting class

During the 2014 recruiting season, SMU gained a commitment from Emmanuel Mudiay, a five-star point guard from Dallas. However, he would instead sign a one-year contract reportedly worth $1.2 million to play with the Guangdong Southern Tigers of the Chinese Basketball Association. While Mudiay's family indicated the signing was financially motivated, news reports indicated that he was unlikely to be approved for play by the NCAA's eligibility clearinghouse. His NCAA eligibility difficulties stemmed largely from his two years at Prime Prep Academy in Arlington, Texas—a school that has never had any of its academic courses approved by the NCAA to establish a player's eligibility.

Roster
ֶ

Schedule and results

|-
!colspan=9 style=""| Non-conference regular season 

|-
!colspan=9 style=""| Conference regular season

|-
!colspan=9 style=""| American Athletic Conference tournament

|-
!colspan=9 style=""| NCAA tournament

Rankings

References

SMU Mustangs men's basketball seasons
Smu
Smu